1978 Canadian federal budget may refer to:

 The April 1978 Canadian federal budget
 The November 1978 Canadian federal budget